The University of Strathclyde is a public research university located in Glasgow, Scotland. Founded in 1796 as the Andersonian Institute, it is Glasgow's second-oldest university, having received its royal charter in 1964 as the first technological university in the United Kingdom. Taking its name from the historic Kingdom of Strathclyde, it is Scotland's third-largest university by number of students, with students and staff from over 100 countries.

The institution was named University of the Year 2012 by Times Higher Education and again in 2019, becoming the first university to receive this award twice. The annual income of the institution for 2021–22 was £387.8 million of which £108.3 million was from research grants and contracts, with an expenditure of £520.4 million.

History
The university was founded in 1796 through the will of John Anderson, professor of Natural Philosophy at the University of Glasgow, who left instructions and the majority of his estate to create a second university in Glasgow which would focus on "Useful Learning" – specialising in practical subjects – "for the good of mankind and the improvement of science, a place of useful learning". The university later named its city centre campus after him.

In 1828, the institution was renamed Anderson's University, partially fulfilling Anderson's vision of two universities in the city of Glasgow. The name was changed in 1887, to reflect the fact that there was no legal authority for the use of the title of 'university'. As a result, the Glasgow and West of Scotland Technical College was formed, becoming the Royal Technical College in 1912, and the Royal College of Science and Technology in 1956 concentrating on science and engineering teaching and research.  Undergraduate students could qualify for degrees of the University of Glasgow or the equivalent Associate of the Royal College of Science and Technology (ARCST).

Under Principal Samuel Curran, internationally respected nuclear physicist (and inventor of the scintillation counter), the Royal College gained University Status, receiving its Royal Charter to become The University of Strathclyde in 1964, merging with the Scottish College of Commerce at the same time.  Contrary to popular belief, The University of Strathclyde was not created as a result of the Robbins Report – the decision to grant the Royal College university status had been made earlier in the 1960s but delayed as a result of Robbins Report.  The University of Strathclyde was the UK's first technological university reflecting its history, teaching and research in technological education.  In 1993, the university incorporated Jordanhill College of Education.

The university has grown from approximately 4,000 full-time students in 1964 to over 20,000 students in 2003, when it celebrated the 100th anniversary of the laying of the foundation stone of the original Royal College building.

In July 2015, Her Majesty The Queen opened the University of Strathclyde Technology and Innovation Centre (TIC).

Campus

The John Anderson Campus is located mostly within the Townhead district, on the north-eastern side of Glasgow city centre, with some buildings located slightly south of this in the Merchant City area.  The campus grew initially from the massive Royal College Building on George Street - which was originally the location of the former Anderson's Institution.  Work started in 1903 and completed in 1912, it was partially opened in 1910 and at the time was the largest educational building in Europe for technical education.  Originally built as the Glasgow and West of Scotland Technical College Building, it now houses Bioscience, Chemistry, and Electronic and Electrical Engineering.  In the late 1950s, campus expansion began with the construction of the James Weir, Thomas Graham and Student's Union buildings.  Following the granting of the Royal Charter and the Royal College gaining university status in 1964, the campus grew quickly in size, expanding eastwards towards High Street on an area that had been rezoned for educational use and its slum housing cleared as part of the Townhead "comprehensive development area" (CDA).

The James Weir Building, built in two stages in 1957 and 1962, was reconstructed and reopened in 2014 after a serious fire resulted in many rooms being unusable.

University of Strathclyde Students' Association was founded in 1964 out of the merger of the respective student unions of both the Royal College and the Scottish College of Commerce and was located at 90 John Street, which was constructed by the Royal College in 1959.  It remained the home of the Association until August 2021, when it moved into new accommodation within the former Colville Building on Richmond Street.

The Graham Hills Building was originally an office block known as 'Marland House', built by the General Post Office and completed in 1959 for the GPO's Telephones division and other governmental organisations but was acquired by the University in 1987 from British Telecom and converted for academic use in the early 1990s.  It is now the location of the "Strathclyde Wonderwall" - one of the biggest wall murals in the United Kingdom.

The early 1960s also saw the fruition of a collaborative deal between the then Royal College and the Corporation of Glasgow to regenerate the Richmond Street site opposite the main buildings.  This led to the construction of the McCance Building and the Livingstone Tower between 1962 and 1964, the latter having originally been designed as a commercial office block, but was instead leased to the University in 1965, and has been used as an academic building ever since.

The Architecture Building, completed in 1967, was designed by Frank Fielden and Associates, Frank Fielden being the Professor of Architecture in the Architecture School at the time.  In 2012, Historic Scotland granted Listed Building Status (grade B) to it, along with the Wolfson Building designed by Morris and Steedman Architects.  2012 also saw the 20th Century Society select the Architecture Building as their 'Building of the Month' for September due to its cultural significance and enduring appeal.
Meanwhile, a new biomedical sciences building was opened in early 2010. It was designed by Shepparrd Robson, and aims to bring the multi-faceted disciplines of the Institute together under one roof. Sited on Cathedral Street in Glasgow, the 8,000 m2 building is the gateway to the university campus and city centre from the motorway.

The University of Strathclyde Centre for Sports, Health and Wellbeing is a leisure facility undergoing construction situated adjacent to 100 Cathedral Street. Construction began in November 2016 and completed in 2019.

Since taking over Jordanhill College in 1993, the university operated two campuses - The John Anderson Campus and the Jordanhill campus until 2012 when the Jordanhill campus was closed and everything was moved to the John Anderson Campus.

Library and archives

The Andersonian Library is the principal library of the University of Strathclyde. Established in 1796, it is one of the largest of its type in Scotland. It is situated in the Curran Building - a former warehouse owned by William Collins and Sons, but purchased by the University and converted in 1980. Situated over 5 floors at present, the Andersonian Library has more than 2,000 reader places, 450 computer places and extensive wi-fi zones for laptop use. It has around one million print volumes as well as access to over 540,000 electronic books, 239 databases and over 38,000 e-journals that can be used 24/7 from any suitably enabled computer.

The archives are divided into 3 as follows.

University Archives

The official records of the University of Strathclyde from 1796 to the present day. Includes the records of the university's predecessor institutions as well as the papers of many former staff and students and associated organisations.

Deposited Archives

A diverse range of archives which have been acquired by gift or deposit to support the university's teaching and research.

Special Collections

Rare or significant printed material and books, including the Anderson Collection (the personal library of John Anderson, 1726–1796, natural philosopher), plus over 30 other collections spanning the 16th to the 21st centuries.

Technology and Innovation Centre

The University of Strathclyde Technology and Innovation Centre is a centre for technological research. The construction of this centre began in March 2012 and was completed in March 2015. The nine-storey, steel-framed building can accommodate around 1200 workers from numerous fields, including engineering, researching and project management. It includes open plan space for offices, three lecture theatres and areas for specialist laboratory equipment.

The project secured a £6.7 million funding from the European Regional Development Fund and another £26 million from the Scottish Government. The university itself supplied the other £57 million needed to reach its £89 million budget needed to create the centre.

In addition to the Technology and Innovation Centre, a 5000m2 Industry Engagement Building is located adjacent to the TIC building.

Research carried out in the Technology and Innovation Centre is in the fields of: Advanced Engineering and Manufacturing, Advanced Science and Technology, Bionanotechnology, Business Engagement, Continuous Manufacturing and Crystallisation (CMAC), Energy, Health Technologies at Strathclyde, Human and Social Aspects of Technology, Photonics and Sensors, and Asset Management.
The TIC hosts the UK's first Fraunhofer research centre, the Fraunhofer Centre for Applied Photonics and TIC also plays a major role in Scotland's International Technology and Renewable Energy Zone (ITREZ).

Faculties and departments

The university currently consists of four main faculties categorised based on subjects and academic fields that they deal with and each faculty is sub divided into several departments which deal with specific academic and research areas. They are:

 Faculty of Engineering
 Architecture
 Biomedical Engineering
 Chemical and Process Engineering
 Civil and Environmental Engineering
 Design, Manufacture and Engineering Management
 Electronic and Electrical Engineering
 Mechanical and Aerospace Engineering
 National Centre for Prosthetics and Orthotics
 Naval Architecture, Ocean and Marine Engineering (Joint department with the University of Glasgow)
 Faculty of Science
 Chemistry, Pure and Applied Chemistry
 Computer and Information Sciences
 Mathematics and Statistics
 Physics
 Strathclyde Institute of Pharmacy and Biomedical Sciences

 Humanities & Social Sciences (HaSS)
 School of Applied Social Sciences
 School of Education
 School of Government & Public Policy
 School of Humanities
 School of Law
 School of Psychological Sciences and Health
 School of Social Work and Social Policy
 Strathclyde Business School
 Accounting and Finance
 Economics
 Human Resource Management
 Hunter Centre for Entrepreneurship
 Management Science
 Marketing, The Department of
 Strategy and Organisation, The Department of

The university delivered teaching to  full-time and part-time students in :  undergraduates and  postgraduates. Another 34,000 people take part in continuing education and professional development programmes. The university's main campus, John Anderson Campus, is located in the centre of Glasgow, near George Square. Till 2012, the university operated an education campus in the suburb of Jordanhill, at the site of the previous Jordanhill Teacher Training College which it disposed of and relocated to a new building in the John Anderson Campus. In January 2012, The university's Court also endorsed the recommendation of the Estates Steering Group that Strathclyde moves to a single campus by disposing of the entire Jordanhill site and constructing a new building for the Faculty of Education on the John Anderson campus.

Strathclyde is the only Scottish university that offers the IET Power Academy engineering scholarships to its engineering students.

Academic profile

Admission and enrolment

Rankings and reputation

The university is highly ranked among the top 10 in the UK in various subjects according to the Complete University Guide 2019, namely being 1st for Accounting & Finance; 1st for Social Policy; 1st for Aural & Oral Sciences; 1st for Communication & Media Studies; 1st for Pharmacology and Pharmacy; 1st for Medical Technology; 1st for Hospitality, Leisure, Recreation & Tourism; 2nd for Marketing; 2nd for Forensic Science; 5th for Architecture; 5th for English; 6th for Business & Management Studies; 6th for Electrical & Electronic Engineering; 7th for Chemical Engineering; 8th for Civil Engineering; 8th for General Engineering and 9th for Mechanical Engineering. The university is ranked in the top ten universities in Britain in the subject Politics according to the Complete University Guide 2022. The university also ranked second in 2019 on social policy and administration in the national ranking according to The Guardian. Times Higher Education (THE) placed History at Strathclyde 9th for research intensity in a field of 83 UK universities in the 2014 REF.

Strathclyde is placed in the top 20 of European business schools  in the Financial Times Global MBA Rankings 
. In this regard, QS World University Ranking placed Strathclyde among 51-100 best universities in business management. Strathclyde Master's programs take 36th place globally in marketing, 51st place globally in business analysis and 55th globally in management, according to QS World University Ranking in 2020.

The University School of Government and Public Policy has a long tradition of interacting with national and global media organizations, governments, parliaments and international organizations such as the EU and OECD. Political science therefore takes 1st place in Scotland in the terms of research intensity. According to URAP Center Ranking, which has been publishing annual rankings since 2010 for each subject, the University of Strathclyde is constantly included in the top 120 global universities in politics. In 2013, QS World University Ranking placed Strathclyde among 101-150 best global universities in politics and international relations. In 2020, ARWU ranked Strathclyde in the 101-150 best Political Science universities. Ever since ARWU began to publish a separate subject ranking on Public Administration, Strathclyde has consistently ranked internationally among 76-100 best universities in 2017, 2018, 2019 and 2020.

According to The Complete University Guide, Strathclyde Law School is in the UK's top 10 (2020). According to Times Higher Education, the University of Strathclyde was placed 76th best in law globally among universities in 2018.

QS World University Rankings 2018 placed the university among the top 25 internationally for Hospitality & Leisure Management, 51-100 for Pharmacy, 51-100 for Business & Management, 101-150 for Electrical & Electronic Engineering, 101-150 for Architecture, 101-150 for Education, 151-200 for Accounting & Finance, 151-200 for Law, 151-200 for Civil & Structural Engineering, 151-200 for Mechanical Engineering, 201-250 for Chemical Engineering, 201-250 for Physics and Astronomy, 251-300 for Sociology, 251-300 for Economics, 251-300 for Materials Sciences, 301-350 for Mathematics and 301-350 for Computer Science & Information Systems.

The University of Strathclyde is a 5-star QS-rated university.

The university is one of the 39 old universities in the UK comprising the distinctive Cluster Two of elite universities after Oxbridge. A detailed study published in 2015 by Vikki Boliver has shown among the Old universities, Oxford and Cambridge emerge as an elite tier, whereas the remaining 22 Russell Group universities are undifferentiated from 17 other prestigious Old universities (including the University of Strathclyde) which form the second cluster.

Research
In 2011 the university's Advanced Forming Research Centre was announced as a leading partner in the first UK-wide Technology Strategy Board Catapult Centre. The Government also announced that the university is to lead the UK-wide EPSRC Centre for Innovative Manufacturing in Continuous Manufacturing and Crystallisation.

The university has become the base for the first Fraunhofer Centre to be established in the UK. Fraunhofer-Gesellschaft, Europe's largest organisation for contract research, is creating the new Fraunhofer Centre for Applied Photonics in collaboration with Strathclyde, for research in sectors including healthcare, security, energy and transport.

Strathclyde was chosen in 2012 as the exclusive European partner university for South Korea's global research and commercialisation programme – the Global Industry-Academia Cooperation Programme, funded by South Korea's Ministry of Knowledge and Economics.

In 2012 the university became a key partner in its second UK Catapult Centre. Plans for the Catapult Centre for Offshore Renewable Energy were announced at Strathclyde by Business Secretary Vince Cable. The university has also become a partner in the Industrial Doctorate Centre for Offshore Renewable Energy, which is one of 11 doctoral centres at Strathclyde.

Engineers at the university are leading the €4 million, Europe-wide Stardust project, a research-based training network investigating the removal of space debris and the deflection of asteroids.

Strathclyde has become part of the new ESRC Enterprise Research Centre, a £2.9 million venture generating world-class research to help stimulate growth for small and medium-sized enterprises.

Since 2016 the Wellcome Trust has invested over £3 million of funding awards in the university's Centre for the Social History of Health and Healthcare, for research projects, teaching and training programmes, and to build Medical Humanities partnerships in Africa and Asia.

The university has centres in pharmacy, drug delivery and development, micro and ultrasonic engineering, biophotonics and photonics, biomedical engineering, medical devices, new therapies, prosthetics and orthotics, the history of health and healthcare, law, crime and justice and social work. The university is involved in 11 partnerships with other universities through the Scottish Funding Councils' Research Pooling Programme, covering areas such as engineering, life sciences, energy, marine science and technology, physics, chemistry, computer sciences and economics.

Several Strathclyde staff have been elected to Fellowships in the Royal Societies of Edinburgh and London.

Notable people

Students

There are around 15,000 undergraduate students out of which almost 4,000 are mature students who start their studies after gaining experience in the workplace, and almost 16% are overseas students from more than 100 countries around the world. Around 7,000 students are undertaking postgraduate studies at Strathclyde. There are approximately 45,000 students studying part-time in the university each year, either in the evenings and weekends or through distance learning. The university also has an alumni population of over 100,000 and growing.

Notable academics and alumni

Alumni of Strathclyde and its predecessors (the Andersonian Institute and the Royal College of Science and Technology) include the scientists; William Ramsay, Nobel Prize Winner in Chemistry (1904); John Logie Baird, inventor of the first working television; Henry Faulds, physician, missionary and scientist who developed of fingerprinting; James Young, chemist best known for his method of distilling paraffin from coal and oil shales; Professor John Curtice, a renowned political commentator, Fellow of the British Academy, the Royal Society of Arts and the Royal Society of Edinburgh.

In politics: Annabel Goldie, Baroness Goldie, Leader of the Scottish Conservative Party, member of the House of Lords, Minister of State for Defense; Helen Liddell, Baroness Liddell of Coatdyke, minister in Blair government, a House of Lords member, former British High Commissioner to Australia, former Minister for Trade and Industry, former Minister for Transport, former Economic Secretary of the Treasury, the first female General Secretary of the Scottish Labour Party at the age of 26 from 1977 to 1978; John McFall, Baron McFall of Alcluith, Senior Deputy Speaker of the House of Lords; Alex Ifeanyichukwu Ekwueme, the first elected Vice-President of Nigeria; Fahri Hamzah, an Indonesian politician and currently a deputy speaker of the People's Representative Council; Omar Abdullah, Indian politician, Chief Minister of J & K state, former Minister of State for External Affairs; Nikos Pappas, Greek Minister of Digital Policy, Telecommunications and Media in Alexis Tsipras' cabinet; David Gordon Mundell, Secretary of the State for Scotland in Cameron and May governments, Conservative MP; Eduardo Doryan, Costa Rican Minister of Education; Ann McKechin, Member of Parliament, former Shadow Secretary of State for Scotland; Jim Murphy, Labour Member of Parliament and former Secretary of State for Scotland; Malcolm Gray Bruce, Baron Bruce of Bennachie, Deputy Leader of Liberal Democrats, Chair of the International Development Committee, Leader of the Liberal Democrats in Scotland, member of House of Lords; Elish Angiolini, Lord Advocate; Jim Murphy leader of Labour Party in Scotland in 2014–2015; Lord Bracadale, Senator of the College of Justice, Lord Commissioner of Justiciary; Sir Simon Stevens (healthcare manager) is a  Chief Executive of the National Health Service; John Charles Walsham Reith, 1st Baron Reith, the Director-General of the BBC; Michael Peter Evans-Freke, 12th Baron Carbery, an Irish peer; John Ruaridh Grant Mackenzie, 5th Earl of Cromartie, a Scottish peer, the current chief of Clan Mackenzie; Alexander Macmillan, 2nd Earl of Stockton, Conservative MP, member of the House of Lords, grandson of prime minister Harold Macmillan; Nazir Karamagi, Tanzanian Minister of Energy and Minerals, Minister of Industry, Trade and Marketing; Francis Nhema, Zimbabwean Minister of Youth Development, Minister of Environment; Lord Clive Soley, Baron Soley, Labour MP, member of the House of Lords; Khandaker Mosharraf Hossain, Bangladeshi Minister of Local Government and Engineering Department; Ken Kandodo, Malawi's Minister of Finance; Iain Peebles, Lord Bannatyne, Senator of the College of Justice; Ian McAllister,  Distinguished Professor of Political Science at the Australian National University; Mark Blyth, Scottish-American political scientist and a professor of international political economy at Brown University; K M Baharul Islam - Professor and Chair of Public Policy and Government Center at Indian Institute of Management Kashipur; Fellow, Indian Institute of Advanced Study; Sandra Currie Osborne, Labour MP, a member of the Foreign Affairs Select Committee; Zulkieflimansyah, Indonesian Governor of West Nusa Tenggara;Muhammad Khan Achakzai, Pakistani Governor of Balochistan; Tommy Sheridan, Scottish politician;
Tasmina Ahmed-Sheikh, former MP for Ochil and South Perthshire; Willie Coffey, MSP for Kilmarnock and Irvine Valley.

In business: John Barton, Chairman of Next plc and EasyJet; Sir Thomas Hunter, Entrepreneur and Philanthropist; Jim McColl, Scotland's richest man;John Giannandrea, Vice President at Google, head of Google Search; Brian Souter, co-founder of the Stagecoach Group; Sanjay Jha, chief executive officer of Motorola; chief executive officer of Motorola Mobile Devices; Alastair Storey, chief executive officer of Global Foundries, chairman and chief executive officer of Westbury Street Holdings; and Andrew Wyllie, civil engineer, chief executive officer of the Costain Group and president of the Institution of Civil Engineers.

Other alumni include: David Livingstone, explorer in Africa and medical missionary; Tom Devine, historian; Dame Elish Angiolini, the first female Solicitor General and Lord Advocate of Scotland; Lauren Mayberry, lead singer of synthpop band Chvrches; Aileen McGlynn, Scottish paralympic gold medal-winning tandem cyclist and world record holder; Chris Sawyer, creator of RollerCoaster Tycoon and Transport Tycoon video game series

Academics associated with the university include; James Blyth, generated electrical power from wind; Sir Samuel Curran, inventor of the Scintillation counter; Thomas Graham, chemist who formulated the law of diffusion of gases; Andrew Ure, physician and founder of Andersonian Institution; Matthew Charteris, taught medicine at Anderson's from 1876 to 1880.

See also 

 Armorial of UK universities
 Careers Scotland Space School
 University of Strathclyde Students' Association
 University of Strathclyde Sports Union
 List of UK universities by date of foundation
 List of early modern universities in Europe

Notes

References

External links 

 
 Glasgow Digital Library at the University of Strathclyde
 Strathclyde Students' Union website
 EDWARD VII LAYS FOUNDATION STONE  (1903) (archive film of King Edward VII laying the foundation stone for the Glasgow and West of Scotland Technical College (University of Strathclyde) – from the National Library of Scotland: SCOTTISH SCREEN ARCHIVE)

 
Educational institutions established in 1796
Educational institutions established in 1964
1796 establishments in Scotland
1964 establishments in Scotland
Universities established in the 1960s
Universities UK